El Portillo National Airport  served the province of Samaná. It was located at the north of this province. This airport was used for private flights operators and some charter service into the Dominican Republic.

This airport ceased to be operational in February 2012.

References

External links 
 Video of a Plane Departing to SDQ
Pictures 05/2019

Defunct airports
Airports in the Dominican Republic
Buildings and structures in Samaná Province